Margaret Mahy  (21 March 1936 – 23 July 2012) was a New Zealand author of children's and young adult books. Many of her story plots have strong supernatural elements but her writing concentrates on the themes of human relationships and growing up. She wrote more than 100 picture books, 40 novels and 20 collections of short stories. At her death she was one of thirty writers to win the biennial, international Hans Christian Andersen Medal for her "lasting contribution to children's literature".

Mahy won the annual Carnegie Medal twice. It recognises the year's best children's book by a British subject, and she won for both The Haunting (1982) and The Changeover (1984). (As of 2012 just seven writers have won two Carnegies, none three.) She was also a highly commended runner up for Memory (1987).

Among her children's books, A Lion in the Meadow and The Seven Chinese Brothers and The Man Whose Mother was a Pirate are considered national classics. Her novels have been translated into Te Reo Māori, German, French, Spanish, Dutch, Norwegian, Danish, Swedish, Finnish, Italian, Japanese, Catalan and Afrikaans. In addition, some stories have been translated into Russian, Chinese and Icelandic.

The Margaret Mahy Playground in the Christchurch Central City is named in her honour.

Early life
Mahy was born in 1936, the eldest of five children. She was raised in her birthplace of Whakatane. Her father, Francis George Mahy, was a bridge builder and often told his children adventure stories which later influenced Mahy's writing. Her mother Helen Penlington was a teacher. She was regarded as a 'slow learner', and particularly hated mathematics. Her first published story was "Harry is Bad", written at age seven (published in the children's page of the Bay of Plenty Beacon). She showed it to her class to let them know that they could write stories at any age.

She went to the local high school, where she was acknowledged as a talented swimmer.

Education
Mahy completed her B.A. at Auckland University College (1952–1954) and Canterbury University College, graduating in 1955. In 1956 she trained at the New Zealand Library School, Wellington as a librarian.

Personal life
From around 1965, Mahy lived at Governors Bay on the Banks Peninsula, Canterbury, in the South Island of New Zealand. She was a solo mother and raised two daughters there. At age 62, Mahy had her right shoulder tattooed with the picture of a skull with a rose in its teeth. She was writing about a person being tattooed and considered the tattoo research to enable her to describe the experience convincingly.

In 2007, Mahy adopted a cavoodle puppy she named Honey, because of her colour. Mahy died at the Nurse Maude Hospice in St Albans, Christchurch on 23 July 2012, aged 76. She had been diagnosed with an inoperable cancerous jaw tumour in April 2012 and had been moved to a hospice about nine days before her death.

Her final book Tail of a Tale, published posthumously in 2014, was commissioned by Polish photographer Tomasz Gudzowaty.

Career

She worked as a librarian in Petone, the School Library Service in Christchurch, and in 1976 was appointed Children's Librarian at Canterbury Public Library. During this time many of her stories were published in the New Zealand School Journal and her first book saw her become known internationally. A Lion in the Meadow was a School Journal story from 1965. It was published in 1969 by J.M. Dent in the U.K. and Franklin Watts in the U.S., as a large-format picture book illustrated by Jenny Williams. Also in 1969, William Heinemann Ltd and Watts published another large-format picture book, The Dragon of an Ordinary Family with illustrations by Helen Oxenbury, who won the Greenaway Medal from the British librarians recognising the year's best illustrated children's book. There were three others in that same year.

Mahy wrote several fantasy novels, including The Haunting and The Changeover.

Mahy became a full-time writer in 1980. She went on to win numerous book awards and honours for her contributions to New Zealand and to children's literature. One was an honorary Doctor of Letters from the University of Canterbury. In 1985 she established the Margaret Mahy Fees Scholarship at the University of Canterbury.

The Margaret Mahy Medal Award was established by the New Zealand Children's Book Foundation in 1991 to provide recognition of excellence in children's literature, publishing and literacy in New Zealand.

On 6 February 1993, Mahy was appointed a Member of the Order of New Zealand, for her contributions to children's literature. In March 2009 she was commemorated as one of the Twelve Local Heroes and a bronze bust of her was unveiled outside the Christchurch Arts Centre.

In 2010 her book Kaitangata Twitch was adapted for television and aired on Māori Television. Directed by Yvonne Mackay and produced by The Production Shed.TV, the series includes a cameo appearance by Margaret Mahy in a library scene.

Awards

The biennial Hans Christian Andersen Award conferred by the International Board on Books for Young People is the highest recognition available to a writer or illustrator of children's books. Mahy received the writing award in 2006. Jury president Jeffrey Garrett wrote in the press release:

In awarding the 2006 Hans Christian Andersen Medal for Writing to Margaret Mahy, the jury has recognized one of the world's most original re-inventors of language. Mahy's language is rich in poetic imagery, magic, and supernatural elements. Her oeuvre provides a vast, numinous, but intensely personal metaphorical arena for the expression and experience of childhood and adolescence. Equally important, however, are her rhymes and poems for children. Mahy's works are known to children and young adults all over the world.

Mahy won the Carnegie Medal in 1982 for The Haunting. In 1984 she won the medal again for The Changeover. In 2005 she won the Phoenix Prize for The Catalogue of the Universe.

The Margaret Mahy Award, named for Mahy, is presented annually to "a person who has made a significant contribution to the broad field of children's literature and literacy". Mahy was the first recipient of the award in 1991. Lectures by the winners are published, the standard of which was set by Mahy's inaugural lecture, Surprising Moments.

In 2013, the top prize for young adult fiction at the New Zealand Post Children's Book Awards was renamed the Margaret Mahy Book of the Year award. Also in 2013, a playground based on her work was commissioned to be built in Christchurch's East Frame.

Some other awards:
 Italian Premier Grafico Award, The Wind Between the Stars, 1976
 Dutch Silver Pencil Award, The Boy Who Was Followed Home, 1977
 New Zealand Post Children's Book Awards, Best Young Adult Novel, 2003, Alchemy
Prime Minister's Awards for Literary Achievement (2005)
 Phoenix Award, 2005, The Catalogue of the Universe (1985)
 Phoenix Award runner-up (Honor Book), 2006, The Tricksters
 Sir Julius Vogel Award, 2006, for services to New Zealand science fiction and fantasy
 Phoenix Award, 2007, Memory
 New Zealand Post Children's Book Awards, Children's Book of the Year, 2011, The Moon and Farmer McPhee—picture book written by Mahy and illustrated by David Elliot

The Phoenix Award from the Children's Literature Association designates the best English-language children's book that did not win a major award when it was originally published twenty years earlier. It is named for the mythical bird phoenix, which is reborn from its ashes, to suggest the book's rise from obscurity. Mahy is one of three authors to win it twice (1985 to 2012).

Works

Mahy wrote more than 100 picture books, 40 novels and 20 collections of short stories published between 1969 and 2014.

Notes

References

Further reading
 "Introducing Margaret Mahy". Betty Gilderdale. Viking Kestrel 1987.

External links

 
Tessa Duder, Dictionary of New Zealand Biography essay, Te Ara - the Encyclopedia of New Zealand, 2018
 The Margaret Mahy pages at Christchurch City Libraries
 Margaret Mahy at Storylines Children's Literature Charitable Trust – with biography, selected bibliography, and awards list
 Margaret Mahy on Gecko Press's website
 Margaret Mahy at NZ On Screen – with biography, partial screenography, and free streamed videos of Mahy's television work
 Maragaret Mahy collection at Radio New Zealand
 Margaret Mahy at New Zealand Book Council – with biography, short descriptions of many of her books, and other information
 
 
 

New Zealand children's writers
New Zealand women novelists
New Zealand fantasy writers
Carnegie Medal in Literature winners
Hans Christian Andersen Award for Writing winners
Members of the Order of New Zealand
University of Canterbury alumni
People from Whakatāne
People educated at Whakatane High School
People from Christchurch
1936 births
2012 deaths
20th-century New Zealand novelists
21st-century New Zealand novelists
New Zealand women children's writers
Women science fiction and fantasy writers
21st-century New Zealand women writers
Penlington family